Memory of Encaustic Tile is a 2022 Chinese streaming television series based on the novel Glazed Tiles of the Past by Bei Feng San Bai Li. It stars Chen Yuqi and Lin Yi in lead. It aired on Youku from January 26 to February 24, 2022.

The series was filmed in Hengdian World Studios from October 2020 to January 2021.

Plot 
The series chronicles the coming-of-age story of childhood friends who have grown up together in Liuli Hutong. Shao Xue, Zheng Sunian, Zhang Qi, Lin Shiyin, and Wu Huan are the children of the conservators who work for the Palace Museum. Going through the SARS outbreak, loss of the relative, College Entrance Examination, Beijing Olympics, and the demolition of Hutong, they finally grow up and decide their different futures.

Cast

Main 
 Chen Yuqi as Shao Xue (邵雪). She is a cheerful and lovely girl, and pursues the similar lifestyle as Zheng Sunian's mother.
 Lin Yi as Zheng Sunian (郑素年). He is a warm and quite boy, and one year ahead than other childhood friends in the grade level.
 Yan Zidong as Zhang Qi (张祈). He is a math genius, and has a crush on Shao Xue for years.
 Tian Ai as Lin Shiyin (林诗音). She has a relationship with Sun Kai.
 Sun Kai as Wu Huan (吴欢). He loves Lin Shiyin, but finally breaks up due to the reality.

Soundtrack

References

External links

on Weibo
on Perfect World Pictures

Television series by Perfect World Pictures
Chinese high school television series
2022 Chinese television series debuts